is a passenger railway station  located in the city of Odawara, Kanagawa Prefecture, Japan, operated by operated by both the East Japan Railway Company (JR East) and the Central Japan Railway Company (JR Tōkai).

Lines
Kōzu Station is served by both the Tōkaidō Main Line and Gotemba Line, and is located 77.7 kilometers from Tokyo Station. Some trains of the Shōnan-Shinjuku Line also stop at this station.

Station layout
The station has one side platform and two island platforms serving five tracks, connected to the station building by a footbridge. The station has a Midori no Madoguchi staffed ticket office.

Platforms

History

Kōzu Station opened on July 11, 1887. With the dissolution and privatization of Japanese National Railways (JNR) on April 1, 1987, the station became a border station under the control of both JR East and JR Central.

Passenger statistics
In fiscal 2019, the station was used by an average of 5,845 passengers daily.

The passenger figures (boarding passengers only) for previous years are as shown below.

Surrounding area
 Kōzu Post Office
 Kōzu Elementary School
 Kōzu Junior High School
Yamachika Memorial Hospital

See also
 List of railway stations in Japan

References

Yoshikawa, Fumio. Tokaido-sen 130-nen no ayumi. Grand-Prix Publishing (2002) .

External links

 JR East station information 

Shōnan-Shinjuku Line
Railway stations in Japan opened in 1887
Railway stations in Odawara